Murat Hacıoğlu (born 10 June 1979) is a Turkish footballer, who plays for Sakaryaspor.

He previously played for Etimesgut Şekerspor, Diyarbakırspor, Konyaspor, and Fenerbahçe SK. After his successful seasons at different Anatolian clubs, he joined to the powerful İstanbul club, Fenerbahçe SK. Under the control of Christoph Daum, he could not find enough chance to play and usually waited as a substitute. He was loaned out to Konyaspor for the 2005/06 season. Getting chances to showcase his talent, Murat played inconsistently and failed to impress the Fenerbahçe board and coaches. He was subsequently transferred to Kocaelispor.

He has been capped by the Turkey national football team.

References

External links

 Guardian Stats Centre
 

1979 births
Turkish footballers
Turkey B international footballers
Fenerbahçe S.K. footballers
Konyaspor footballers
Diyarbakırspor footballers
Ankaraspor footballers
Kocaelispor footballers
Denizlispor footballers
Altay S.K. footballers
Living people
Turkey international footballers
Süper Lig players
Association football midfielders